Colin Patrick Baker (born 29 October 1985), also known as Colin Scanlan, is an Irish former footballer.

He started his career at Aylesbury United, and played for other non-league clubs up until 2006, where he moved to play football in Hong Kong. There, he represented Rangers and Hong Kong FC, before returning to his native Ireland to join Limerick 37. He only scored one goal for Limerick, a late equaliser against Shelbourne, which denied Shelbourne the title and promotion in the 2008 season. He left the club at the end of the season, but stayed in the area to play locally in the Limerick & District League. He is currently the youth academy coach at Limerick.

References

External links
Profile at aylesburyunited.co.uk

1985 births
Living people
Republic of Ireland association footballers
Irish expatriate sportspeople in Hong Kong
Expatriate footballers in Hong Kong
Association football midfielders
Aylesbury United F.C. players
Stevenage F.C. players
Chesham United F.C. players
Windsor & Eton F.C. players
Hong Kong Rangers FC players
Limerick F.C. players
Hong Kong First Division League players